Misled by Certainty is the sixth studio album by the Colorado-based deathgrind band Cephalic Carnage. It was released on August 31, 2010, through Relapse Records. Misled by Certainty sold 1300 copies in the United States in its first week, appearing at the #24 position on Billboard Heatseekers. This is the first album with Brian Hopp as a guitarist. In support of this album, Cephalic Carnage toured Europe during September and October 2010; for this tour, called the "Initiation of the Misled European Tour 2010", Cephalic Carnage performed alongside Psycroptic, Ion Dissonance, Hour of Penance, and Dyscarnate. Four vlogs of the recording process for this album have been posted online.

A video was released for "The Incorrigible Flame" in early August 2010. A video for "Ohrwurm" was released in September 2010.

Track listing

Personnel
 Lenzig Leal – vocals
 John Merryman – drums
 Steve Goldberg – guitar
 Nick Schendzielos – bass guitar, vocals
 Brian Hopp – guitar

Additional musicians
 Alex Camargo – vocals ("Power and Force")
 Blaine Cartwright – vocals ("P.G.A.D.")
 Ross Dolan – vocals ("Abraxas of Filth")
 Pat Hanson – keyboards ("Abraxas of Filth, "Repangaea", "Cordyceps Humanis")
 Zac Jefferson – vocals ("Raped by an Orb")
 Bruce Lamont – saxophone ("Ohrwurm", "Repangaea"), vocals ("Repangaea")
 Dave Otero – vocals ("Warbots A.M.")
 Katherine Rosser – vocals ("Repangaea")
 Travis Ryan – vocals ("When I Arrive")
 Keith Sanchez – vocals ("P.G.A.D.")
 Sherwood Webber – vocals ("Cordyceps Humanis")

Production
Dave Otero – production
Jeff Dunne – editing
Orion Landau – album artwork

References

2010 albums
Cephalic Carnage albums
Relapse Records albums